Bolster heath or cushion moorland is a type of vegetation community that features a patchwork of very low growing, tightly packed plants found at the limits of some alpine environments. The cushion plants form a smooth surfaced 'cushions' from several different plants, hence the common name of cushion heath.  The cushion growth habit provides protection against the desiccating wind and help keep the cluster warm.

Bolster heath is very slow growing and thus very fragile.  Most propagation is by slow expansion, although two species, Abrotanella forsteroides and Pterygopappus lawrencei produce enough viable seed to survive fire.  The other species are generally permanently destroyed by fire.

The soil in bolster heath is generally quite poor, often gravel with a thin layer of peat.

Tasmanian bolster heaths

Asteraceae 
 Abrotanella forsteroides (Abrotanella)
 Ewartia meredithiae (Ewartia)
 Pterygopappus lawrencei (Pterygopappus)

Caryophyllaceae 
 Colobanthus pulvinatus (Colobanthus)
 Scleranthus biflorus (Scleranthus)

Donatiaceae 
 Donatia novae-zelandiae (Donatia)

Epacridaceae 
 Dracophyllum minimum (Dracophyllum)

Loganiaceae 
 Mitrasacme archeri (Mitrasacme)

Scrophulariaceae 
 Chionohebe ciliolata (Chionohebe)

Stylidiaceae 
 Phyllachne colensoi (Phyllachne)

Thymelaeaceae 
 Pimelea pygmaea (Pimelea)

Centrolepidaceae 
 Centrolepis monogyna (Centrolepis)
 Centrolepis muscoides (Centrolepis)
 Gaimardia fitzgeraldii (Gaimardia)
 Gaimardia setacea (Gaimardia)

Cyperaceae 
 Carpha rodwayi (Carpha)
 Oreobolus acutifolius (Oreobolus)
 Oreobolus oligocephalus (Oreobolus)
 Oreobolus oxycarpus (Oreobolus)
 Oreobolus pumilio (Oreobolus)

References 
Forest Practices Authority. (2007). Threatened Native Vegetation Community Information Sheet: Cushion moorland. Accessed online: 22 June 2008.

Biogeography
Heaths